St. John's Chapel belonged to the Episcopal parish of Trinity Church in Tribeca, Manhattan, New York City.

History 
It was constructed in 1803 to designs by John McComb Jr. and his brother Isaac McComb on Varick Street, facing St. John's Park. McComb gave it a sandstone tetrastyle prostyle portico supporting a tower and multi-storeyed spire that rose to 214¼ feet. Master builders for the chapel have been recorded as T. C. Taylor, Henry Hedley, Daniel Domanick and Isaac McComb. The chancel was added in 1857 to designs by Richard M. Upjohn.

The original location of this church was one of the most attractive in New York. It stood opposite the eastern side of St. John's Park, whose tree-shaded walks were a favorite recreational spot for the well-to-do residents of the neighbourhood. In 1867 Trinity Church, which had retained ownership of the park, sold it to the Hudson River Railroad for a downtown freight terminal. This unfortunate occurrence changed the character of the residential section nearby; the warehouse's undesirable influences were felt for many blocks in every direction. What had been a neighborhood of patrician dwellings was reduced to a slovenly purlieu of ramshackle buildings.

The congregation left in the 1890s and the structure was torn down in 1918. It was cleared during a construction project that widened Varick Street and also facilitated construction of the IRT Broadway – Seventh Avenue Line. City officials wanted to allow the portico to protrude into the widened street and vault the flanking pedestrian sidewalk under it because they recognized the steeple’s importance as a landmark. The Episcopal Church instead decided to demolish the building.

References

External links
 
 St. John's Chapel records at Trinity Wall Street Archives

19th-century Episcopal church buildings
Buildings and structures demolished in 1918
Chapels in the United States
Churches completed in 1803
Churches in Manhattan
Closed churches in New York City
Demolished churches in New York City
Demolished buildings and structures in Manhattan
Federal architecture in New York City
Former Episcopal church buildings in New York City
Richard Upjohn church buildings
1803 establishments in New York (state)
1918 disestablishments in New York (state)
John McComb Jr. buildings